Jacob Gould Schurman (May 2, 1854 – August 12, 1942) was a Canadian-born American educator and diplomat, who served as President of Cornell University and United States Ambassador to Germany.

Early life
Schurman was born at Freetown, Prince Edward Island on May 2, 1854 the son of Robert and Lydia Schurman. Schurman lived on his parents' farm as a child, then in 1867 took a job at a store near his home, which he held for two years.

At the age of fifteen, Schurman entered the Summerside Grammar School on Prince Edward Island, and in 1870 he won a scholarship to study at Prince of Wales College for two years.  After Prince of Wales College, he studied for a year and a half at Acadia College in Nova Scotia.

In 1874 while a student at Acadia College in Wolfville, Nova Scotia, he won the Canadian Gilchrist scholarship to study at the University of London, from which he received a BA degree in 1877 and an MA in 1878. Schurman also studied in Paris, Edinburgh, Heidelberg, Berlin, Göttingen and Italy.

He was professor of English literature, political economy and psychology at Acadia College in 1880–1882, of metaphysics and English literature at Dalhousie College, Halifax, Nova Scotia, in 1882–86, and of philosophy (Sage professor) at Cornell University in 1886–92, being Dean of the Sage School of Philosophy in 1891-92 where he edited The Philosophical Review.

In 1892 he became the third president of Cornell University, a position he held until 1920. He received an LL.D (honoris causa) from the University of Edinburgh in March 1902.

Cornell president
As Cornell's president, Schurman helped invent the modern state-supported research university. Under the Morrill Act, states were obligated to fund the maintenance of land grant college facilities, but were not obligated to fund operations. Subsequent laws required states to match federal funds for agricultural research stations and cooperative extension. In his inaugural address as Cornell's third president on November 11, 1892, Schurman announced his intention to enlist the financial support of the state. Cornell, which had been offering a four-year scholarship to one student in each New York assembly district every year and was the state's land-grant university, was determined to convince the state to become a benefactor of the university. In 1894, the state legislature voted to give financial support for the establishment of the New York State College of Veterinary Medicine and to make annual appropriations for the college. This set the precedents of privately controlled, state-supported statutory colleges and cooperation between Cornell and the state. The annual state appropriations were later extended to agriculture, home economics, and following World War II, industrial and labor relations.

In  1898, Schurman persuaded the State Legislature to found the first forestry college in North America, the New York State College of Forestry. The College undertook to establish a  demonstration forest in the Adirondacks, funded by New York State. However, the plans of the school's director Bernhard Fernow for the land drew criticism from neighbors, and Governor Benjamin B. Odell vetoed the 1903 appropriation for the school. In response, Cornell closed the school. Subsequently, in 1911, the State Legislature established a New York State College of Forestry at Syracuse University, and the remains of Cornell's program became the Department of Natural Resources in its Agriculture College in 1910. The State later followed the same model to establish a state college of ceramics at Alfred University.

In 1911, Schurman ruled in favour of admitting two Black female students to Sage Hall despite 269 of their white female peers petitioning to deny them residency.

International career

He was the chairman of the First United States Philippine Commission in 1899, and wrote (besides a part of the official report to Congress) Philippine Affairs--A Retrospect and an Outlook (1902). With J. E. Creighton and James Seth he founded in 1892 The Philosophical Review. He also wrote Kantian Ethics and the Ethics of Evolution (1881); The Ethical Import of Darwinism (1888); Belief in God (1890), and Agnosticism and Religion (1896).

Schurman served as United States Ambassador to Greece in 1912–13, Minister to China between 1921 and 1925, and then as Ambassador to Germany between 1925 and 1929, a position twice previously held by Cornell's first president Andrew Dickson White. In 1917 Schurman was appointed honorary chairman of the American Relief Committee for Greeks of Asia Minor, an organization which provided humanitarian relief to Ottoman Greeks during the Greek genocide. He retired to Bedford Hills, New York in 1930.

In 1960, Cornell named the administrative wing of its veterinary school Jacob Gould Schurman Hall in his honor.  In 2021, the Cornell Filipino Association sought to discredit Schurman due to the work of the Philippine Commission and demanded that his name be removed from the building.  After hearing from both sides, Cornell President Martha Pollack rejected the move.   in 1967, Jacob Gould Schurman III endowed the Schurman professorships in his honor.  Cornell describes them as "one of the most prestigious chairs at the university."

Personal life 
Jacob Gould Schurman married Barbara Forrest Munro (1865–1930) in 1884; they had seven children, including youngest daughter Dorothy Schurman Hawes, who wrote about China.

Notes

References

Further reading

External links

 Cornell Presidency: Jacob Gould Schurman
 Cornell University Library Presidents Exhibition: Jacob Gould Schurman (Presidency; Inauguration)
 
 
 

1854 births
1942 deaths
Acadia University alumni
Alumni of the University of Edinburgh
Canadian emigrants to the United States
Canadian people of Dutch descent
Presidents of Cornell University
Ambassadors of the United States to China
Ambassadors of the United States to Germany
People from Prince County, Prince Edward Island
Ambassadors of the United States to Greece
Persons of National Historic Significance (Canada)
New York State College of Forestry
People from Bedford Hills, New York
20th-century American diplomats